This is a list of worldwide brands and manufactures of toy soldiers.

A
 A Call To Arms
 Accurate
 Airfix
 Almark
 Armourfast
 Atlantic (company)
 Aurora Plastics Corporation
 Armies In Plastic
B
 Barcelona Universal Models (BUM)
 Barclay
 Benbros
 Bergen Toy & Novelty Co. or Beton 
 Billy V
 Britains
BMC Toys
C
 Caesar
 CBG Mignot
 Chialu
 Co.Ma.
 Coates and Shine
 Crescent Toys

D
  Dapol
  Dark Dream Studio
  Deetail – A Britains brand.
  Dulcop
  Durso
E
  Eagle Games
  Eduard
  Elastolin
  Emhar
  Ente Scambi Coloniali Internazionali (ESCI)
  Expeditionary force
  Evolution
F
 First To Fight
 Fleurbaix Toy Soldiers
 Fujimi

G
 GerMan
 Giant
 Gulliver

H
 Hasegawa
 HaT
 Hegemony
 Heller 
 Herald Miniatures – A Britains brand.
  (Heyde) - Dresden, Germany before World War II
I
 Ideal Toy Company
 IMEX
 Italeri
J
 Jack Scruby
 John Hill & Company
K
 Kienel
L
 Legio
 Linear-A
 Linear-B
 Leyla
 Lineol
 Lone Star Toys
 Louis Marx and Company
 Lucky Toys
 LW
M
 Manoil
 Mars
 Matchbox
 Metch
 Miniart
 MM
 Model Kasten
 Model Products Corporation (MPC)
 Monogram
N
 Nexus
O
 Odemar
 Orion
  Osul
P
 Panzer vs Tanks
 Pegasus
 Plastic Soldier Company (PSC)
 Pobeda
 Preiser
Q
 Quiralu

R
 RedBox
 Revell
S

 Sarum
 Sanderson
 Strelets

T
 T-Model
 Tamiya
 Testor's
 Timpo Toys
 Timmee
 Toxso
 Toysmith
 Tragik
 T.S.S.D.
U
 Ultima Ratio
 Universal Plastics
V
 Valdemar
 Valiant
 Vertunni
W
 Wend-Al
warhansa
 Waterloo 1815
X
Y
 Ykreol
Z
 Zvezda

References

Plastic Soldier Review, http://plasticsoldierreview.com/Manufacturers.aspx accessed 23 July 2022
 
soldiers brands